Paul Revere and the World He Lived In is a book by Esther Forbes . It  won the 1943 Pulitzer Prize for History.

References 

Pulitzer Prize for History-winning works